Puelén is a village and rural locality (municipality) in La Pampa Province in Argentina.

References

Populated places in La Pampa Province